Vladimir Sergeyevich Boitsov (born September 13, 1985 in Chusovoy, Perm Krai, Russian SFSR) is a Russian luger who has competed since 2002. He competed in the men's doubles event at the 2006 Winter Olympics in Turin, but crashed during the first run and did not finish.

Boitsov finished 16th in the men's doubles event at the 2006 FIL European Luge Championships in Winterberg, Germany.

References
 2006 luge men's doubles results

External links 
 

1985 births
Living people
Russian male lugers
Olympic lugers of Russia
Lugers at the 2006 Winter Olympics
People from Chusovoy
Sportspeople from Perm Krai